Twelve national teams were competing in the men's Olympic field hockey tournament at the 2016 Summer Olympics in Rio de Janeiro. Sixteen players were officially enrolled in each squad. Two reserve players could also be nominated to be available should a player enrolled in the official squad become injured during the tournament.

Pool A

Australia
The following is the Australia roster in the men's field hockey tournament of the 2016 Summer Olympics. Aran Zalewski replaced Tristan White after he tore his posterior cruciate ligament a month before the games.

Head coach: Graham Reid

Jamie Dwyer
Simon Orchard
Glenn Turner
Chris Ciriello
Matt Dawson
Mark Knowles (C)
Eddie Ockenden
Jake Whetton
Blake Govers
Matthew Gohdes
Aran Zalewski
Tim Deavin
Matthew Swann
Daniel Beale
Andrew Charter (GK)
Fergus Kavanagh

Reserves:
 Jeremy Hayward
 Tom Craig
 Tyler Lovell

Belgium
The following is the Belgium roster in the men's field hockey tournament of the 2016 Summer Olympics.

Head coach: Shane McLeod

Arthur Van Doren
John-John Dohmen (C)
Florent van Aubel
Sebastien Dockier
Cédric Charlier
Gauthier Boccard
Emmanuel Stockbroekx
Thomas Briels
Felix Denayer
Vincent Vanasch (GK)
Simon Gougnard
Loïck Luypaert
Tom Boon
Jérôme Truyens
Elliot Van Strydonck
Tanguy Cosyns

Reserves:
 Alexandre de Paeuw
 Jeremy Gucassoff (GK)
 Alexander Hendrickx

Brazil
The following is the Brazil roster in the men's field hockey tournament of the 2016 Summer Olympics.

Head coach: Sidney Rocha

Thiago Bomfim (GK)
Bruno Mendonça
Joaquín Lopez
Adam Imer
André Patrocínio (C)
Yuri van der Heijden
<li value=9>Stephane Vehrle-Smith
<li value=10>Matheus Borges
<li value=11>Lucas Paixão
<li value=13>Bruno Paes
<li value=14>Ernst Rost-Onnes
<li value=15>Patrick van der Heijden
<li value=19>Rodrigo Steimbach
<li value=23>Christopher McPherson
<li value=27>Paulo Batista Junior
<li value=31>Rodrigo Faustino (GK)

Reserves:
 Marcos Pasin
 Augusto Felipe

Great Britain
The following is the Great Britain roster in the men's field hockey tournament of the 2016 Summer Olympics.

Head coach: Bobby Crutchley

<li value=1>George Pinner (GK)
<li value=5>David Ames
<li value=6>Henry Weir
<li value=7>Ashley Jackson
<li value=8>Simon Mantell
<li value=9>Harry Martin
<li value=11>Alastair Brogdon
<li value=12>Michael Hoare
<li value=13>Samuel Ward
<li value=14>Mark Gleghorne
<li value=16>Adam Dixon
<li value=17>Barry Middleton (C)
<li value=22>David Condon
<li value=24>Iain Lewers
<li value=26>Nicholas Catlin
<li value=27>Daniel Fox
<li value=31>Ian Sloan

Reserves:
 James Bailey
 Dan Shingles

New Zealand
The following is the New Zealand roster in the men's field hockey tournament of the 2016 Summer Olympics.

Head coach: Colin Batch

<li value=1>James Coughlan
<li value=6>Simon Child (C)
<li value=9>Blair Hilton
<li value=10>Ryan Archibald
<li value=12>Bradley Shaw
<li value=17>Nic Woods
<li value=20>Devon Manchester (GK)
<li value=21>Kane Russell
<li value=22>Blair Tarrant
<li value=23>Shay Neal
<li value=24>Arun Panchia
<li value=25>Shea McAleese
<li value=27>Stephen Jenness
<li value=29>Hugo Inglis
<li value=31>Hayden Phillips
<li value=32>Nick Wilson

Reserves:
 Marcus Child
 Nick Haig

Spain
The following is the Spain roster in the men's field hockey tournament of the 2016 Summer Olympics.

Head coach: Fred Soyez

<li value=1>Francisco Cortés (GK)
<li value=3>Sergi Enrique
<li value=5>Bosco Pérez-Pla
<li value=6>Miquel Delás
<li value=7>Pau Quemada
<li value=8>Viçens Ruiz
<li value=9>Álvaro Iglesias
<li value=10>David Alegre (C)
<li value=11>Roc Oliva
<li value=12>Jordi Carrera
<li value=13>Andrés Mir
<li value=17>Xavi Lleonart
<li value=19>Marc Sallés
<li value=20>Salva Piera
<li value=21>Álex Casasayas
<li value=22>Manel Terraza
<li value=23>Josep Romeu

Reserves:
 Mario Fernández

Pool B

Argentina
The following is the Argentina roster in the men's field hockey tournament of the 2016 Summer Olympics.

Head coach: Carlos Retegui

<li value=1>Juan Manuel Vivaldi (GK)
<li value=2>Gonzalo Peillat
<li value=4>Juan Ignacio Gilardi
<li value=5>Pedro Ibarra (C)
<li value=7>Facundo Callioni
<li value=8>Lucas Rey
<li value=10>Matías Paredes
<li value=11>Joaquín Menini
<li value=12>Lucas Vila
<li value=14> Luca Masso
<li value=16>Ignacio Ortiz
<li value=17>Juan Martín López
<li value=19>Juan Manuel Saladino
<li value=20> Isidoro Ibarra
<li value=22>Matías Rey
<li value=24>Manuel Brunet
<li value=26>Agustín Mazzilli
<li value=27>Lucas Rossi

Reserves:
 Tomás Santiago (GK)

Canada
The following was the Canada roster in the men's field hockey tournament of the 2016 Summer Olympics. The roster consisted of 16 athletes.

Head coach: Anthony Farry

<li value=2>Benjamin Martin
<li value=4>Scott Tupper (C)
<li value=5>Devohn Noronha-Teixeira
<li value=7>Gabriel Ho-Garcia
<li value=10>Keegan Pereira
<li value=11>Jagdish Gill
<li value=14>Adam Froese
<li value=16>Gordon Johnston
<li value=17>Brenden Bissett
<li value=19>Mark Pearson
<li value=21>Matthew Sarmento
<li value=23>Iain Smythe
<li value=26>Matthew Guest
<li value=27>Sukhi Panesar
<li value=29>Taylor Curran
<li value=30>David Carter (GK)

Germany
The following is the German roster in the men's field hockey tournament of the 2016 Summer Olympics.

Head coach: Valentin Altenburg

<li value=1>Nicolas Jacobi (GK)
<li value=2>Mathias Müller
<li value=3>Linus Butt
<li value=6>Martin Häner (C)
<li value=7>Moritz Trompertz
<li value=8>Mats Grambusch
<li value=10>Christopher Wesley
<li value=12>Timm Herzbruch
<li value=13>Tobias Hauke
<li value=15>Tom Grambusch
<li value=17>Christopher Rühr
<li value=20>Martin Zwicker
<li value=21>Moritz Fürste
<li value=23>Florian Fuchs
<li value=27>Timur Oruz
<li value=29>Niklas Wellen

Reserves:
 Tobias Walter (GK)
 Oskar Deecke
 Oliver Korn

India
The following is the India roster in the men's field hockey tournament of the 2016 Summer Olympics.

Head coach: Roelant Oltmans

<li value=1>Harmanpreet Singh
<li value=3>Rupinder Pal Singh
<li value=5>Kothajit Singh
<li value=6>Surender Kumar
<li value=7>Manpreet Singh
<li value=8>Sardara Singh
<li value=12>V. R. Raghunath
<li value=15>S. K. Uthappa
<li value=16>P. R. Sreejesh (C & GK)
<li value=17>Danish Mujtaba
<li value=22>Devinder Walmiki
<li value=24>S. V. Sunil
<li value=27>Akashdeep Singh
<li value=29>Chinglensana Singh
<li value=31>Ramandeep Singh
<li value=32>Nikkin Thimmaiah

Reserves:
 Vikas Dahiya
 Pardeep Mor

Ireland
The following is the Irish roster in the men's field hockey tournament of the 2016 Summer Olympics.

Head coach: Craig Fulton

<li value=1>David Harte (GK) (C)
<li value=3>John Jackson
<li value=4>Jonathan Bell
<li value=6>Ronan Gormley
<li value=7>Michael Watt
<li value=8>Chris Cargo
<li value=10>Alan Sothern
<li value=11>John Jermyn
<li value=12>Eugene Magee
<li value=13>Peter Caruth
<li value=14>Kirk Shimmins
<li value=16>Shane O'Donoghue
<li value=20>Michael Darling
<li value=24>Kyle Good
<li value=26>Paul Gleghorne
<li value=27>Conor Harte

Reserves:
 Tim Cockram
 Michael Robson
 David Fitzgerald

Netherlands
The following is the Netherlands roster in the men's field hockey tournament of the 2016 Summer Olympics.

Head coach: Max Caldas

[[Jaap Stockmann]] (GK)
<li value=6>[[Glenn Schuurman]]
<li value=8>[[Billy Bakker]]
<li value=9>[[Seve van Ass]]
<li value=10>[[Valentin Verga]]
<li value=11>[[Jeroen Hertzberger]]
<li value=12>[[Sander de Wijn]]
<li value=13>[[Sander Baart]]
<li value=14>[[Robbert Kemperman]]
<li value=16>[[Mirco Pruyser]]
<li value=19>[[Bob de Voogd]]
<li value=21>[[Jorrit Croon]]
<li value=22>[[Rogier Hofman]]
<li value=24>[[Robert van der Horst]] ([[Captain (sports)|C]])
<li value=29>[[Hidde Turkstra]]
<li value=30>[[Mink van der Weerden]]
{{div col end}}

Reserves:
 [[Pirmin Blaak]] (GK)
 [[Constantijn Jonker]]<section end=NED />

References
{{Reflist}}

{{Field hockey at the Summer Olympics}}
{{Competitors at the 2016 Summer Olympics}}

{{DEFAULTSORT:Field hockey at the 2016 Summer Olympics - Men's team squads}}
[[Category:Field hockey at the 2016 Summer Olympics – Men's tournament|squads]]
[[Category:Field hockey players at the 2016 Summer Olympics| ]]
[[Category:Olympic field hockey squads|2016]]
[[Category:Lists of competitors at the 2016 Summer Olympics]]